Mike Benson (born May 13, 1987) is a Canadian football long snapper for the Winnipeg Blue Bombers of the Canadian Football League (CFL). He played CIS football for the Acadia Axemen and attended St. Paul's High School in Winnipeg. He has also been a member of the Edmonton Eskimos, Toronto Argonauts, BC Lions, Ottawa Redblacks, and Montreal Alouettes.

Professional career

Edmonton Eskimos
Benson was signed by the Edmonton Eskimos on June 11, 2012. He was released by the Eskimos on June 17, 2012. He signed with the Eskimos on October 18, 2012.

Toronto Argonauts
Benson signed with the Toronto Argonauts on June 1, 2014. He was released by the Argonauts on June 22, 2014.

BC Lions
Benson was signed by the BC Lions on August 31, 2014. During his fourth year as the Lions' long snapper, Benson recovered a muffed punt that he had snapped and which Edmonton wideout Brandon Zylstra failed to secure. Benson returned the ball for a touchdown against his former team. Benson received a one-year contract extension to remain with the Lions on January 11, 2018. He played in all 18 games in 2018, but was released from BC during the following off-season on May 1, 2019. During six years in the CFL and 84 games played, Benson had accumulated 16 tackles on special teams.

Ottawa Redblacks
Benson signed with the Ottawa Redblacks to a practice roster agreement on July 22, 2019. Benson was called up when Ottawa's regular long snapper Louis-Philippe Bourassa was suspended for two games. Benson also played the final three games of the season for Ottawa. He was released by the Redblacks on January 23, 2020.

Montreal Alouettes
On January 27, 2020, it was announced that Benson had signed a one-year contract with the Montreal Alouettes. However, the 2020 CFL season was cancelled and he did not play for the Alouettes.

Winnipeg Blue Bombers
Upon entering free agency, Benson signed with his hometown Winnipeg Blue Bombers on February 9, 2021. He played in all 14 regular season games and both post-season games in 2021 as he finished the season as a Grey Cup champion following the Blue Bombers' victory over the Hamilton Tiger-Cats in the 108th Grey Cup game.

References

External links
Winnipeg Blue Bombers bio
Just Sports Stats
BC Lions bio

Living people
1987 births
Acadia Axemen football players
BC Lions players
Canadian football long snappers
Canadian Junior Football League players
Edmonton Elks players
Montreal Alouettes players
Ottawa Redblacks players
Players of Canadian football from Manitoba
Canadian football people from Winnipeg
Winnipeg Blue Bombers players